Pirogue Island State Park is a public recreation area on an island in the Yellowstone River, two miles north of Miles City, Montana. The  state park has  of designated hiking trails and, according to the Montana Department of Tourism, "[w]ildlife viewing, fishing for sauger, river floating, and Montana moss agate hunting are popular activities."

References

External links
Pirogue Island State Park Montana Fish, Wildlife & Parks
Pirogue Island State Park Trail Map Montana Fish, Wildlife & Parks

State parks of Montana
Protected areas of Custer County, Montana
Protected areas established in 1982
1982 establishments in Montana
River islands of Montana
Yellowstone River